Enid Zentelis is an American writer, filmmaker, and podcaster. She is best known for directing features Evergreen and Bottled Up and for her podcast, How My Grandmother Won WWII.

Life and career
Zentelis was born in Los Angeles, California. She is a first generation American, born to a Hungarian-Jewish mother and Latvian father. She is a graduate of Hampshire College and the Graduate Film Program at NYU, where she was taught by Spike Lee, Martin Scorsese and mentored by Mary Harron. Her essays and literary nonfiction have appeared in the Daily Beast, The FemWord, and Talkhouse. She is a professor of filmmaking at the New York University Tisch School of the Arts.

Zentelis's major works include, Evergreen, premiered in Dramatic Competition at Sundance Film Festival in 2004. In 2013, she directed Bottled Up, starring Melissa Leo, Marin Ireland and Josh Hamilton. In 2021, she created the podcast, How My Grandmother Won WWII, about the discovery that her grandmother worked with British Special Ops during the Holocaust. In 2022, she sold her podcast to Kinetic Content with a scripted series development deal.

Filmography

Publications 
 2022 – Everybody Gets Killed

Awards and nominations

References

External links
 
 

Living people
American film directors
21st-century American women writers
American women film directors
American women screenwriters
American women podcasters
American podcasters
Year of birth missing (living people)